919 Ilsebill (prov. designation:  or ) is a dark background asteroid from the central region of the asteroid belt. It was discovered on 30 October 1918, by astronomer Max Wolf at the Heidelberg-Königstuhl State Observatory in southwest Germany. It was named after "Ilsebill", a character in the fairy tale The Fisherman and his Wife by the Brothers Grimm.

Orbit and classification 

Ilsebill is a non-family asteroid of the main belt's background population when applying the hierarchical clustering method to its proper orbital elements. It orbits the Sun in the central asteroid belt at a distance of 2.5–3.0 AU once every 4 years and 7 months (1,686 days; semi-major axis of 2.77 AU). Its orbit has an eccentricity of 0.08 and an inclination of 8° with respect to the ecliptic. The body's observation arc begins at Heidelberg Observatory with its official discovery observation on 30 October 1918.

Naming 

This minor planet was named after the character "Ilsebill" in the fairy tale The Fisherman and his Wife by the Brothers Grimm. The asteroid was named likely after the discoverer's death in 1932, upon a proposal made by his widow , and subsequently published by ARI. The  was also mentioned in The Names of the Minor Planets by Paul Herget in 1955.

Physical characteristics 

In the Bus–Binzel SMASS classification and in the SDSS-based taxonomy, Ilsebill is a common, carbonaceous C-type asteroid.

Rotation period 

In October 2010, a rotational lightcurve of Ilsebill was obtained from photometric observations by Zachary Pligge, Ben Hall and Richard Ditteon at the U.S. Oakley Observatory  in Indiana. Lightcurve analysis gave a well-defined rotation period of  hours with a brightness variation of  magnitude.

A modeled lightcurve using photometric data from the Lowell Photometric Database and from the Wide-field Infrared Survey Explorer (WISE) was published in 2018. It gave a concurring sidereal period of  hours and includes a partial spin axis at (β1  −53.0°) in ecliptic coordinates (λ, β).

Diameter and albedo 

The Collaborative Asteroid Lightcurve Link derives its estimate from IRAS, that is, an albedo of 0.0638 and a diameter of 27.62 km based on an absolute magnitude of 11.4.

References

External links 
 Lightcurve Database Query (LCDB), at www.minorplanet.info
 Dictionary of Minor Planet Names, Google books
 Discovery Circumstances: Numbered Minor Planets (1)-(5000) – Minor Planet Center
 
 

000919
Discoveries by Max Wolf
Named minor planets
Grimms' Fairy Tales
000919
19181030